Turiec is a region in central Slovakia.

Turiec may also refer to:

Turóc County, a former county of the Kingdom of Hungary
Turiec (Sajó), a river in southern Slovakia
Turiec (Váh), a river in northwestern Slovakia
Turiec Basin, the basin of the Turiec in northwestern Slovakia